Jeffrey Kevin van Homoet Bruma (born 13 November 1991), commonly known as Jeffrey Bruma, is a Dutch professional footballer who plays as a centre-back for Eredivisie club SC Heerenveen.

Club career

Chelsea
Bruma joined Chelsea's youth setup from Feyenoord at the age of 15 for a fee of £100,000, and was making appearances for the reserve team by the age of 16. In the 2007–08 season, Bruma played centre back in every round of the FA Youth Cup run to the final and made the most appearances in the youth league. Bruma also played for the Netherlands U-21 national team.

In September 2009, Bruma was added to Chelsea's UEFA Champions League squad and was on the bench against Porto. On 13 October 2009, Bruma made his debut for the Netherlands U-21 national football team in an Under-21 Championship qualifying game victory over Poland. Eleven days later, Bruma made his Premier League debut for Chelsea, coming on as a substitute in a 5–0 victory over Blackburn Rovers.

On 2 December 2009, Bruma made his League Cup debut, coming on as a substitute for Juliano Belletti in the quarter final in a match against Blackburn Rovers, a match which Chelsea later lost on penalties.

On 20 February 2010, Bruma made his second Premier League appearance, in the 2–0 victory at Wolverhampton Wanderers, where he was a 56th-minute substitute replacing the injured Yuri Zhirkov.

Although Bruma was playing for Chelsea's first team, he was also playing in the youth squad, scoring a goal in the FA Youth Cup Final; First Leg at Villa Park. Chelsea went on to beat Aston Villa 3–2 on aggregate to lift the trophy for the first time since 1961.

He was named in the Netherlands squad in July 2010. He featured in a friendly match against Ukraine, which finished 1–1 earning his first cap. On 1 September 2010, Bruma signed a new four-year contract which would keep him at Chelsea until at least 2014.

He came on for Alex against Blackpool on 19 September 2010 and played a whole 90 minutes in a League Cup match against Newcastle on 22 September 2010.

Bruma had his first start in the Premier League in a home game against Aston Villa, where he partnered captain John Terry in central defence. The match was played on 2 January 2011 and ended in a 3–3 draw. Bruma played the whole game.

Loan to Leicester City
On 11 February 2011, Bruma joined Leicester City on loan until the end of the 2010–11 season, where he linked up with fellow Chelsea loanee Patrick van Aanholt. He made his debut for Leicester as a second-half substitute for Sol Bamba in the 84th of the team's 2–0 away win at Derby County on 12 February 2011. Bruma made his first start in a 2–0 defeat to Cardiff City.

Bruma stated that he aimed to use the loan to Leicester City to earn a place in Chelsea's first team or a move elsewhere. If not he stated he would like to go on loan again.

On 2 April 2011, against Middlesbrough, Bruma conceded a penalty for handball that was saved by goalkeeper, Chris Weale. Shortly after this incident he received the first red card of his senior career after receiving two yellow cards for dissent towards the referee. Leicester City drew the game 3–3.

Leicester had not won in the first seven starts Bruma had for the club. He was then moved into central midfield and he scored his first two league goals in a 4–2 win over Watford on 25 April 2011; both efforts were struck from 30 yards out.

Loan to Hamburger SV

Bruma joined Hamburger SV on a one-year loan deal, until 30 June 2012, with an option for another year and was given the number 5 shirt. On 23 September 2011, he scored his first Bundesliga goal in a 2–1 victory against VfB Stuttgart, the equalizing goal to make the score 1–1.

Bruma's loan was extended for another season at Hamburger SV after making 22 appearances and scoring two goals in the previous season. In April 2013, it was announced that the club had decided not to sign him permanently.

PSV
On 26 June 2013, it was announced that Bruma had signed a contract with PSV. As part of the deal to take Bruma to Eindhoven, Chelsea insisted there was a buy-back clause in his contract. On 30 July 2013, Bruma made his PSV debut in a 2–0 victory over Zulte Waregem, therefore giving PSV a 5–0 victory on aggregate in this UEFA Champions League qualifying tie. On 3 August 2013, Bruma made his league debut in a 3–2 victory over ADO Den Haag, playing the full 90 minutes. On 2 November 2013, Bruma scored his first PSV goal in a 1–1 draw with PEC Zwolle, netting in the third minute.

VfL Wolfsburg
On 26 June 2016, Bruma made a return to German football, signing a five-year deal with Bundesliga side VfL Wolfsburg for an undisclosed fee.

Following a five-year spell with the club, Bruma left in July 2021 at the end of his contract.

Loan to Schalke 04
On 31 January 2019, Bruma was loaned to Schalke 04 until the end of the campaign.

Loan to Mainz 05
On 29 January 2020, Mainz 05 announced their signing of Bruma on loan for the remainder of the 2019–20 season.

Kasımpaşa
On 3 August 2021, Bruma agreed to join Turkish side, Kasımpaşa on a two-year deal, with an option of a third year. He went onto make his debut during a 1–1 draw with Hatayspor on 14 August.

Heerenveen
On 30 January 2023, Bruma signed a contract with Heerenveen until the end of the season, replacing injured Heerenveen captain Sven van Beek, returning to the Eredivise after 7 years.

International career

Bruma has represented the Netherlands at all youth levels: under-17, under-18, under-19 and under-21 levels. With the U17's, Bruma played in the 2007 European Under-17 Championship. At U21, Bruma made his debut at 17 years old, on 4 September 2009, during a qualifying match for the 2011 UEFA European Under-21 Championship against Finland, where his team won 2–0.

On 11 August 2010, Bruma received his first call-up in the selection of the Netherlands making his debut, starting against Ukraine, with Jeremain Lens, Siem de Jong and Ricky van Wolfswinkel three other debutants in the starting line, which ended a 1–1 draw. His second appearance for the Netherlands would be the 8 June 2011, another 1–1 draw against Uruguay, having replaced Joris Mathijsen at half-time.

Bruma scored his first international goal on 16 November 2014 against Latvia in a qualifying match for UEFA Euro 2016, which the Dutch won 6–0.

Career statistics

Club

International

International goals
Scores and results list Netherlands' goal tally first.

Personal life
Bruma's mother is from Suriname and his father is Dutch. His older brother, Marciano Bruma, and his cousins Kyle Ebecilio  and Noa Lang are also football players. His uncle is former Premier League full-back Fabian Wilnis.

Honours

Club
PSV
Eredivisie: 2014–15, 2015–16
Johan Cruyff Shield: 2015

References
 General
 
 Jeffrey Bruma at Voetbal International 
 
 

 Specific

External links

 

1991 births
Living people
Footballers from Rotterdam
Dutch footballers
Dutch expatriate footballers
Dutch sportspeople of Surinamese descent
Netherlands youth international footballers
Netherlands under-21 international footballers
Netherlands international footballers
Expatriate footballers in England
Expatriate footballers in Germany
Expatriate footballers in Turkey
Association football defenders
Feyenoord players
Chelsea F.C. players
Leicester City F.C. players
Hamburger SV players
PSV Eindhoven players
Premier League players
English Football League players
Bundesliga players
Eredivisie players
Süper Lig players
VfL Wolfsburg players
FC Schalke 04 players
1. FSV Mainz 05 players
Kasımpaşa S.K. footballers
SC Heerenveen players
Dutch expatriate sportspeople in England
Dutch expatriate sportspeople in Germany
Dutch expatriate sportspeople in Turkey